George Connor (August 16, 1906 – March 28, 2001) was an American racecar driver.

Complete AAA Championship Car results

Indianapolis 500 results

 In 14 Indianapolis starts, Connor drove  without leading a lap. This ranks 6th on the all-time list.

Complete Formula One World Championship results
(key)

References

1906 births
2001 deaths
AAA Championship Car drivers
Indianapolis 500 drivers
Racing drivers from California
Sportspeople from Rialto, California